Apisalome Vota (born 6 October 1996) is a Fijian rugby union player, currently playing for the . His preferred position is centre.

Professional career
Vota was named in the Fijian Drua squad for the 2022 Super Rugby Pacific season. He had previously represented the Drua in the 2018 National Rugby Championship.

References

External links
itsrugby.co.uk Profile

1996 births
Living people
Fijian rugby union players
Rugby union centres
Fijian Drua players